Aquatron may refer to:

Media
 Aquatron (video game), an Apple II and Atari 8-bit 1983 shooter video game

Research
 Dalhousie University Aquatron marine laboratory

Other
 Camas Tuath's Aquatron composting toilet system